Kingston upon Hull, often simply referred to as Hull, was a parliamentary constituency in Yorkshire, electing two members of parliament to the House of Commons of the Parliament of the United Kingdom, from 1305 until 1885. Its MPs included the anti-slavery campaigner, William Wilberforce, and the poet Andrew Marvell.

History
Kingston upon Hull was a borough constituency in the town (later city) of Hull. Until the Great Reform Act of 1832, it consisted only of the parish of St Mary's, Hull and part of Holy Trinity, Hull, entirely to the west of the River Hull. This excluded parts of the urban area which had not been originally part of the town, but some of these – the rest of Holy Trinity parish, Sculcoates, Drypool, Garrisonside and part of Sutton-on-Hull – were brought into the constituency by boundary changes in 1832. This increased the population of the borough from around 16,000 to almost 50,000.

The borough sent its first two known Members to the Parliament of 1305 and thereafter with fair regularity from 1334. Until the Reform Act, the right to vote in Hull was vested in the freemen of the city, which made the constituency one of the larger and more competitive ones. At the general election of 1831, 2,174 voters went to the polls.

The Hull constituency was abolished for the 1885 general election, the city being divided into three single-member constituencies, Kingston upon Hull Central, Kingston upon Hull East and Kingston upon Hull West.

Members of Parliament

MPs 1305–1640

MPs 1640–1885

Election results

Elections in the 1830s

  

  
  

  

Carruthers' death caused a by-election.

  

  
  

 On petition, Wilberforce's election was declared void and Hutt was declared elected in 1838.

Elections in the 1840s

  
  

  

Baines was appointed President of the Poor Law Board, requiring a by-election.

Elections in the 1850s

  
  

After an election petition committee found evidence of bribery and treating, both members were unseated and the writ was suspended in March 1853. A by-election was then held in August 1854.

 
  

Watson resigned after being appointed a Baron of the Exchequer, causing a by-election.

 
 
  

 

 
 

 

Hoare was unseated after an election petition committee found evidence of corruption, causing a by-election.

Elections in the 1860s

Elections in the 1870s
Clay's death caused a by-election.

Elections in the 1880s

Notes

References

External links
D. Brunton & D. H. Pennington, "Members of the Long Parliament" (London: George Allen & Unwin, 1954)
Cobbett's Parliamentary history of England, from the Norman Conquest in 1066 to the year 1803" (London: Thomas Hansard, 1808)
F. W. S. Craig, "British Parliamentary Election Results 1832–1885" (2nd edition, Aldershot: Parliamentary Research Services, 1989)
J. Holladay Philbin, "Parliamentary Representation 1832 – England and Wales" (New Haven: Yale University Press, 1965)
Henry Stooks Smith, "The Parliaments of England from 1715 to 1847" (2nd edition, edited by FWS Craig – Chichester: Parliamentary Reference Publications, 1973)
Frederic A. Youngs, jr., "Guide to the Local Administrative Units of England, Vol II" (London: Royal Historical Society, 1991)

Politics of Kingston upon Hull
Parliamentary constituencies in Yorkshire and the Humber (historic)
Constituencies of the Parliament of the United Kingdom established in 1305
Constituencies of the Parliament of the United Kingdom disestablished in 1885